David Doyle is the name of:

 David Doyle (actor) (1929–1997), American actor
 David Doyle (judge), Manx judge
 David Doyle (producer), American television producer
 David Doyle (rower) (born 1961), Australian who competed in rowing at the 1984 Summer Olympics – Men's coxless four
 David Doyle (soccer) (born 1965), Irish soccer forward
 David J. Doyle, Michigan politician
 David W. Doyle (1924–2014), CIA officer and author
 David Doyle (writer), American writer on historic military vehicles
 David K. Doyle (born 1931), United States Army general